Urgala (Urğalı) is a rural locality (a selo) and the administrative centre of Urgalinsky Selsoviet, Belokataysky District, Bashkortostan, Russia. The population was 1,672 as of 2010. There are 21 streets.

Geography 
Urgala is located 44 km southeast of Novobelokatay (the district's administrative centre) by road. Morozovka is the nearest rural locality.

References 

Rural localities in Belokataysky District